Johan Vilhelm Gertner (10 March 1818 – 28 March 1871) was a Danish painter, best known for his portraiture. One of the last students of Christoffer Wilhelm Eckersberg, who was known as the father of the Golden Age of Danish Painting, Gertner belonged to the tail end of the Golden Age, a period during which Danish art moved towards a more realistic style, relying on inspiration both from French Realism and emerging photographic techniques.

Life and career
Gertner was born to a craftsman at the Holmen Naval Base. He attended the Royal Danish Academy of Fine Arts from  1831 to 1837 where he was one of the pupils of Christoffer Wilhelm Eckersberg, known as the father of the Golden Age of Danish Painting. Eckersberg taught him a naturalistic approach to painting, but Gertner went much further with inspiration from French art and the emerging techniques of photography.

His virtuosity in producing almost photographically precise portraits impressed many; in particular, his ability to reproduce textures and materials — crisp silk dresses, lustrous medals and jewellery, dark mahogany furniture, silky wallpapers, and soft carpets — won him much acclaim. Others, such as the influential art historian and critic Niels Lauritz Høyen, who opposed any foreign influence on Danish painting, disapproved of his style, preferring more sincere and sensitive portrayals. He was a professor at the Academy from 1858.

Works
Gertner painted many of the leading  artists of his time, including Bertel Thorvaldsen in Thorvaldsen in his studio (1839, Thorvaldsens Museum) and C.W. Eckersberg (1850, Royal Danish Academy). Occasionally he also painted genre works, history painting or architecture pieces.

Selected portraits

Exhibitions
 Nivaagaard Painting Collection, Johan Vilhelm Gertner, 2 September – 18 November 2001

See also
 List of Danish painters
 Art of Denmark

References

External links

ArtNet: More works by Gertner.

1818 births
1871 deaths
Royal Danish Academy of Fine Arts alumni
19th-century Danish painters
Danish male painters
Artists from Copenhagen
Danish portrait painters
Recipients of the Thorvaldsen Medal
19th-century Danish male artists